Calgary Expo, known in full as the Calgary Comic and Entertainment Expo, is an annual fan convention held at Stampede Park in Calgary, Alberta, Canada.

Originally taking place in the BMO Centre, the show began in 2005 as a comic book convention before moving on in 2009 to include actors from television shows and movies. The convention has since become the second largest convention in Canada. The convention became famous for having reunited the cast of Star Trek: The Next Generation for the show's 25th anniversary in 2012, and two years later, reuniting nearly the entire cast of Aliens (1986).

As of 2017, Fan Expo HQ (i.e., Informa Canada, Inc.) acquired the convention and its Edmonton spin-off event.

History 
Calgary Expo originally began in 2005 as a comic book convention, before moving on in 2009 to include actors from television shows and movies. As result, the convention quickly became the second largest convention in Canada. Originally taking place n the BMO Centre, the convention expanded in 2013 across the whole Stampede Park, additionally creating an extra tent for panels in 2014.

In 2012, the convention famously reunited the cast of Star Trek: The Next Generation for the series' 25th anniversary, and two years later, reunited nearly the entire cast of Aliens (1986). In 2013, a cosplay parade, which travels through Downtown Calgary and finishes at Olympic Plaza, began at the convention with over 400 participants, followed in 2014 with 690. In 2019, the parade had over 5,000 participants.

In 2016, the convention began to hold the Calgary Expo Holiday Market at BMO Centre, with a focus on vendors and gift shopping.

On 16 October 2017, Informa Canada, Inc., operating as Fan Expo HQ, announced its acquisition of the convention and its Edmonton spin-off event.

Controversies

2012 overselling incident 
In 2012, the convention had gotten even bigger, with the cast of Star Trek: The Next Generation having been announced, and ticket sales increased. On Saturday of 2012, the venue had reached past the maximum capacity, with an estimated attendance having been projected as 45,000. The venue had exceeded capacity, and at 13:00 the Fire Marshall was called; it was deemed safe for 100 people to be admitted every 15 minutes. Many people were turned away and not let into the venue. Despite this, Expo staff had issued a statement claiming the convention was not oversold, and they hadn't been charged because no violations took place.

A week later, the organizers issued a refund plan for people who were not admitted.

Accessibility 
In 2018, following the acquisition of Calgary Expo by North-American pop culture exhibition group Informa Canada, Inc. (operating as Fan Expo HQ), the convention was criticized by disability-rights advocates for removing a long-standing policy that allowed wheelchair users free access to VIP lanes to receive priority access to celebrity autograph and photo opportunities. The organizers stated that the revised policies were intended to provide balanced access for all attendees, were part of a goal to provide an "equal and accessible" experience for all attendees (as the result of the change was to make all attendees require a VIP pass for such access, regardless of disability), and that they were in compliance with relevant legislation.

Programming

The convention offers an extensive range of panels that take place in locations throughout the park. In addition to the exhibitors' hall taking place in BMO halls A-C, and celebrity autograph sessions taking place in D and E, multiple conference rooms throughout the BMO such as the Palomino room host smaller panels. Bigger names will often also have their panels in the Stampede Corral, and some also taking place in the Boyce Theatre. In addition to the regular panels which last 45 minutes, 2012 and 2014 included special, extended panels often labeled as "EXPOsed", which typically last from an hour to two hours long. These have ranged from concert-type panels to discussion panels.

Related events 
In 2012, the Edmonton Comic and Entertainment Expo, an Edmonton-based spin-off of Calgary Expo, was first held at the Edmonton Expo Centre in Northlands. The inaugural edition hosted 15,000; by 2016, attendance had grown to 40,000. The 2017 edition featured an appearance by William Shatner and a concert by Gene Simmons of Kiss.

In 2014, the convention began an affiliation with the Saskatchewan Entertainment Expo in Saskatoon, Saskatchewan, first held in 2013, which was re-branded as the Saskatoon Comic and Entertainment Expo. The affiliation ended in 2018 following the sale to Fan Expo HQ.

In 2016, the convention began to hold the Calgary Expo Holiday Market at BMO Centre, with a focus on vendors and gift shopping.

References

External links 
 

Expo
Recurring events established in 2006
Comics conventions in Canada
2006 establishments in Alberta
Trade fairs in Canada
Art festivals in Canada
Fan conventions